The Finder Darts Masters was a darts tournament held in Egmond aan Zee, Netherlands, sanctioned by the British Darts Organisation and the World Darts Federation, running intermittently under several different names from 1995 to 2018.

The tournament was previously known as the Zuiderduin Masters from 2007 to 2014, as the Leendesk Masters in 2005, as the Doeland Grand Masters from 2001 to 2004, as the European Grand Masters in 2000, and as the Dutch Grand Masters in 1995 and 1996. It was held in December and was traditionally the last BDO event held before the annual World Championship.  The tournament was an unranked event until 2008, when it was installed as a ranking event, along with the World Championships and the World Masters, following the cancellation of the World Darts Trophy and the International Darts League.

The organizers of the event announced in 2019 that that year's event would not take place due to the termination of the sponsorship with Dutch e-commerce company Finder, and the tournament has been discontinued.

History

1995–1996: Dutch Grand Masters
The competition began in 1995, known as the Dutch Grand Masters with Raymond van Barneveld and Francis Hoenselaar winning their first major tournament. The tournament ceased between 1997 and 1999.

2000: European Grand Masters
Following a growth in popularity in darts in the Netherlands because of the great success of players such as Raymond van Barneveld the event returned in 2000. It returned as the "European Grand Masters" in 2000.

2001–2004: Doeland Grand Masters
The tournament became the "Doeland Grand Masters" from 2001 to 2004.

2005: Leendesk Masters
In 2005 the tournament was named the "Leendesk Masters".

2007–2014: Zuiderduin Masters
The 2006 Masters was postponed, and was to be held in March 2007, reverting to its original title "Dutch Grand Masters".

The event was later cancelled, due to lack of sponsorship, but was revived later that year when the tournament venue, the Hotel Zuidenduin, stepped in to sponsor the tournament signing a five-year contract until 2012, and it was branded the Zuiderduin Masters. Following sponsorship from the Hotel Zuiderduin, a women's competition was added in 2008 and after a demonstration tournament for juniors in 2010, a juniors competition was added in 2011. A new three-year contract was agreed in 2011 for it to remain the Zuiderduin Masters up to 2014.

The first nine-dart finish at the tournament was recorded by Darryl Fitton in 2009.

2015–2018: Finder Darts Masters
Finder, an international operating company, took over the naming rights to the tournament from the 2015 edition onwards. It was branded the Finder Darts Masters.

Format

Men 
The field is made up of 24 players. Qualification is determined from the top 16 players from the Zuiderduin Masters ranking table, which is separate from the BDO/WDF World Rankings, as well four players from the International Darts Tour of the Lowlands (IDTL) before its collapse in 2010/2011, and the winner of the Netherlands Champions League of Darts, plus 3 wild cards.  If an IDTL qualifier is already qualified through his ranking, an extra wild card becomes available.

From 2011, the men's winner at the MariFlex Open, a Zuiderduin Masters ranking event, gained automatic entry in to that years Zuiderduin Masters tournament. It was replaced with the Hal Open in 2014, but retained the same stipulations the MariFlex Open had. Since the 2013 Zuiderduin Masters tournament, the men's champion from the previous year was invited back to the following year's tournament.

The 24 players are split into 8 groups, with each player playing 2 matches, best of 9 legs. The top player from each group advance to the quarter-finals, which is played in set format through to the final.

Women 
Following the tournament's inception as a ranking event in 2008, a women's competition was installed with an eight-player field, made up from the top five players in the Zuiderduin Masters rankings, an IDTL qualifier before its collapse, the NDB Champions League of Darts winner and a wildcard.  Likewise with the men's event, an extra wildcard can also be awarded. The competition was played in a straight knockout format.

The women's competition was played in a straight knockout format up to and including the 2010 tournament before a new format was introduced in 2011. The field was shortened to six players. Two groups consist of three players playing one another once, with both group winners advancing to the final. The group stage matches are played over a legs format before the final in played in a sets format.

From 2011, the six-player field has been made up from the top two players in the Zuiderduin Masters rankings, the NDB Champions League of Darts winner, two wildcards and the MariFlex Open winner. From 2011, the women's winner at the MariFlex Open, a Zuiderduin Masters ranking event, gained automatic entry into that years Zuiderduin Masters tournament. It was replaced with the Hal Open in 2014, but retained the same stipulations the MariFlex Open had. Since the 2013 Zuiderduin Masters tournament, the women's champion from the previous year has been invited back to the following year's tournament.

Youth 
The youth tournament was instigated in 2011 with the first winner being Jimmy Hendriks who in the same year also won the WDF World Youth Cup and World Youth Masters.

Venue 
The tournament has been held at the Hotel Zuiderduin in Egmond aan Zee since 2001. The 2000 tournament was held in Hardenberg. In 2007, following the postponement of the 2006 event, plans were made to host the 2007 Dutch Grand Masters in Rosmalen, but after it was cancelled, the plans were aborted and it remained in Egmond.

List of tournaments

Men's

Women's

Youth's

Finalists

References

External links 
 Official website
 Men's tournament history Darts Database.
 Women's tournament history Darts Database.
 Men's tournament history Master Caller.
 Women's tournament history Master Caller.

 
Recurring sporting events established in 1995
Recurring sporting events disestablished in 2018
British Darts Organisation tournaments
Darts in the Netherlands
International sports competitions hosted by the Netherlands
1995 establishments in the Netherlands
2018 disestablishments in the Netherlands